This is the discography for American country music singer Barbara Fairchild.

Albums

Singles

Collaboration singles

References 

Country music discographies
Discographies of American artists